Nimbus Communications Limited was an Indian media and entertainment company, and sports broadcaster, known for its Neo Prime and Neo Sports channels. It had integrated, end-to-end media services focusing on Sports broadcasting, marketing, and filmed entertainment. Headquartered in Mumbai, Nimbus was established in 1987 by Harish Thawani, and had a network of customers across the United States, Canada, UK, Asia, Africa, Australia, New Zealand, Europe, and the Middle East. In addition to India, its operations were also spread across Singapore, the Middle East, and the Caribbean.

In 2006, the company won a four-year global media rights for cricket with BCCI, at $612.18 million (Rs 2,714 crore). In 2010, The Times of India Group acquired a small stake in Nimbus Communications  BCCI was one of their main clients during the 1990s and in the decade of 2010.

In 2018, the Bombay high court ordered the liquidation of Nimbus Communications. According to a lawsuit filed by Union Bank in 2012, Nimbus had failed to pay dues owed on short term loans from UB totaling $375,806,550 (Rs 35 crore).

See also
 NEO Sports Plus
 ATN NEO Cricket

References 

Entertainment companies of India
Companies based in Mumbai
Television production companies of India
Mass media companies established in 1987
Sports mass media in India
1987 establishments in Maharashtra